Jassi Khangura(Jasbir Singh Khangura) is a social entrepreneur, businessman and politician. He is member of Indian National Congress. He was Member of the Punjab Legislative Assembly from 2007 to 2012 and represented Qila Raipur constituency. He is a former British national and returned to India in 2006.

Early life
He was born on 17 November 1963 at Latala, Ludhiana District, Punjab. His father's name Jagpal Singh Khangura. He married Raman daughter of Congress leader Gurinder Singh Kairon and granddaughter of ex-Chief Minister of Punjab Pratap Singh Kairon. He has two children Sabina and Jaibir.

Business
He has invested in Macro Dairy Ventures Pvt Ltd a large scale milk production venture. He is the owner of Hotel Park Plaza Ludhiana.

Political career
He was member of the Labour Party while in the United Kingdom. In 2007, he was elected from Qila Raipur constituency as member of the Punjab Legislative Assembly.

References

Living people
Members of the Punjab Legislative Assembly
Indian National Congress politicians from Punjab, India
Punjabi people
Punjab, India MLAs 2007–2012
1963 births
People from Ludhiana district